The Williams FW07 was a ground effect Formula One racing car designed by Patrick Head, Frank Dernie, and Neil Oatley for the 1979 F1 season.

Design

1979 
It was closely based on the Lotus 79, even being developed in the same wind tunnel at Imperial College London. Some observers, among them Lotus aerodynamicist Peter Wright felt the FW07 was little more than a re-engineered Lotus 79, just having a stiffer chassis. The car was small and simple and extremely light, powered by the ubiquitous Ford Cosworth DFV. It had very clean lines and seemed to be a strong challenger for the new season, but early reliability problems halted any serious threat for the title. While not the first to use ground effects in Formula One, an honour belonging to Colin Chapman and the Lotus 78 (the Lotus 79's predecessor), Head may have had a better grasp of the principles than even Chapman. While Head had been developing the Lotus 78's/79's basic principles in the FW07, Chapman’s design team was attempting to take the ground effect idea further ahead of rivals on the Lotus 80 engaging the entire bottom of the chassis as an aerodynamic device for generating downforce without the necessity of external wings. Since the Lotus 80 solution had many drawbacks, Chapman devised the twin-chassis concept of Lotus 86 and 88 that should have solved the issues, but it was never allowed to race due to failure to comply with existing technical rules.

When the British Grand Prix at Silverstone came around, chief designer Frank Dernie had designed and implemented a system that ensured that the car's all-important skirts touched the ground at all times and had also corrected some aerodynamic leakage at the back of the chassis between the French and British Grand Prix.

1980 
The FW07 became FW07B in 1980, and Alan Jones, now with Carlos Reutemann, developed the FW07 further, working especially on setup and suspension strengthening. The car was now so efficient in creating downforce from its ground effect design that the front wings were unnecessary.

At the 1980 French Grand Prix, Alan Jones used for the first time (in a race) a specially prepared John Judd developed Cosworth DFV. Previously Williams had used "development" DFVs allocated by Cosworth to constructors who were judged to provide the best potential to win races against Renault and Ferrari. Modified in John Judd's workshops in Rugby, the Judd-DFV featured an advanced camshaft/cylinder head design which allowed for greater revs than even a development DFV, producing 500-510 BHP at 11,400 RPM compared to 10,800 RPM of a standard DFV. Since both the Renault turbo V6 produced 520 BHP and the Alfa V12 around 525 BHP, it meant that from the French GP onwards both Alan Jones and Carlos Reutemann had a power deficit of just 10-15 BHP compared to the factory based Alfa's and Renault's, which gave both Jones and Reutemann a fighting chance on power sensitive circuits such as Hockenheim, the Osterreichring, Zandvoort and Imola. The Williams had the advantage of only requiring a fuel tank size of 173 litres, where the Renault needed a 215 litre fuel tank and the Alfa around 205 litres, effectively giving the 1980 Williams FW07 a superior power to weight ratio.

1981 
The FW07B evolved into the FW07C for 1981, and further work was done to the suspension, especially after the FIA banned the moveable skirts needed for effective ground effect. The hydraulic suspension systems were developed by Jones, who hated the rock hard suspension. During a winter test session at the Paul Ricard Circuit in the south of France, he suggested to Frank Williams that to compensate for the harsh ride and the pounding the driver gets while driving the car that he "put suspension on the seat", which Frank thought was a good idea. However, he then replied that Jones should sit on his wallet. 'Yeah,' drawled the tough Aussie, 'then give me something to put in it!' Jones temporarily left Formula One because of the extremely unpleasant ride the FW07C gave, he later described driving the car as "wrecking the internals". 

BBC's Horizon series followed the team during winter testing, and later produced the film Gentlemen, Lift Your Skirts which was broadcast during 1981. The film featured extensive behind the scenes footage of the team at work and interviews with the drivers, Frank Williams and Patrick Head.

FW07D 
The FW07D was an experimental six-wheeled test car (four driven rear wheels, and two undriven front wheels) tested by Alan Jones on a single occasion at the Donington Park circuit. With the FW07D proving the concept, its unique design was incorporated into the six-wheeled FW08B.

Racing history

1979

The car made its debut at the Spanish Grand Prix at Jarama in 1979, the fifth round of the season and the first European round after the non-ground effect FW06 was used for the first four rounds in the Americas and South Africa. The car proved to be reasonably competitive; Australian Alan Jones put the car 13th at Jarama and then 4th for the next round in Belgium; he even led 16 laps of the race before retiring with electrical failure. At the British Grand Prix, Jones stuck the revised Williams on pole and was immediately 2 seconds faster than the next fastest car. The car served to make Team Williams a contender for the first time; Jones retired with fuel pump failure and his Swiss teammate Clay Regazzoni won his last Grand Prix and first since 1976.  Jones then won 4 of the next 5 Grand Prix in Germany, Austria, Holland and Canada in a car that was so much quicker than any of the others, particularly around high-speed circuits. But because the car's competitiveness came only at mid-season, Jones and Williams lost the driver's and constructor's championships to South African Jody Scheckter and Ferrari, respectively. But the FW07's competitiveness meant that Williams was a top contender for the 1980 season and beyond.

1980
Regazzoni was replaced by Carlos Reutemann. While the latter and Williams's other driver, Alan Jones, formed a successful partnership, they were not comfortable with each other. Jones won five races in Argentina, France, Britain, Canada and Watkins Glen in the USA to win his only world championship, while Reutemann won at a wet race in Monaco. Williams won also their first Constructors' Championship. The main challenge to the FW07 came from Nelson Piquet in Brabham's neat BT49.

1981
This time it was Reutemann who challenged Piquet for the championship, narrowly missing out in the final race, but Williams took home the constructors' championship after four more wins. The FW07C was the second fastest car of 1981, behind the Renault RE30, but the Williams was more reliable.

Alan Jones lost two potential victories at Monaco and Hockenheim when fuel pressure "hunting" caused the Cosworth DFV to misfire badly, costing the Australian not just wins but also possibly the 1981 World Drivers Championship. The misfiring which afflicted Jones was caused by the high G forces and acceleration generated by the venturi derived ground effects which caused the fuel in the tank to slosh about so violently that the fuel pump was unable to provide the fuel lines with adequate supply. Carlos Reuetemann also had a similar problem in the French Grand Prix in 1981 when he was in a strong position to finish in the points, and this misfire might also have cost Williams the 1981 Drivers Championship as well.

1982
After Jones retired, Williams took on Keke Rosberg in 1982. His mercurial driving seemed to suit the FW07, which although it was now three years old, was still competitive. After 15 wins, 300 points, one drivers' and two constructors' titles the FW07 was replaced by the similarly engineered FW08 from early 1982.

Complete Formula One World Championship results

(key) (results in bold indicate pole position) (results in italics indicate fastest lap)

* 4 points in  scored using the FW06* 44 points in  scored using the FW08

See also
 Lotus 79
 Brabham BT49

References

External links

Williams Formula One cars
1979 Formula One season cars
1981 Formula One season cars
Formula One championship-winning cars